The Yomba Shoshone Tribe of the Yomba Reservation is a federally recognized tribe of Western Shoshone Indians in central Nevada.

Government
The Yomba Shoshone Tribe is headquartered in Austin, Nevada. The tribe is governed by a democratically elected, six-person tribal council under its constitution. Tribal enrollment as a member requires a one-half degree Shoshone blood quantum (equivalent to one parent), among the highest blood quantum requirements of any tribe.

Reservation

The Yomba Reservation occupies  in Nye County, Nevada. The reservation is divided into two districts: the Upper, including Doyle Ranch, and Lower, including Bowler Ranch.

History
The Yomba band ratified their constitution on 20 December 1939, establishing an elected representative government and becoming federally recognized under the 1934 Indian Reorganization Act. They are one of several bands of Western Shoshone peoples.

References

Bibliography
 Pritzker, Barry M. A Native American Encyclopedia: History, Culture, and Peoples. Oxford: Oxford University Press, 2000. .

External links
Yomba Shoshone Tribe Law and Order Code

Western Shoshone
American Indian reservations in Nevada
Geography of Nye County, Nevada
Native American tribes in Nevada
Federally recognized tribes in the United States
Austin, Nevada